An undeciphered alphabetic stele found in Ördek-Burnu, 20 km south of Sam'al (8 miles south of Zinjirli) in what is now northern Syria, dates to the 9th century BCE.  The language of the inscription is difficult to interpret. It contains Semitic words but is not grammatically Semitic, and may be a mixture of Luwian and a Semitic language. It is kept in Istanbul.

Bibliography
 Mark Lidzbarski: VI. Die Stele von Ördek-burnu. Ephemeris für Semitische Epigraphik III. Giessen 1915, pp. 192–206, pls. 13–15.
 André Lemaire and Benjamin Sass: The Mortuary Stele with Sam’alian Inscription from Ördekburnu near Zincirli, in: BASOR 369, 2013, pp. 57–136.

References

9th-century BC steles
Archaeological sites in Southeastern Anatolia
Ancient Near East steles
Luwian language
Aramaic inscriptions
Unclassified languages of Asia